A Little Love may refer to

Music

Albums
A Little Love (album), a 2008 Cantonese album by Fiona Fung
A Little Love, a 1982 album by Aurra
Just a Little Love, album by Reba McEntire
Give a Little Love (Judds album)
You Gotta Take a Little Love, a 1969 album by jazz pianist Horace Silver
Try a Little Love, album by Sam Cooke

Songs
"A Little Love" (Celeste song), song by Celeste, 2020
"A Little Love", song by Aurra from the album A Little Love (album), 1982
"A Little Love", song by Fiona Fung from the album A Little Love (album), 2008
"A Little Love", song by Corey Hart from Bang! 1990
"A Little Love", song by Don and Dewey B-side to "Jungle Hop" 1957
"A Little Love", song by Miki and Griff 1970
"A Little Love", song by Neon Philharmonic  1971
"A Little Love", song by Jimmy London 1971
"A Little Love", song by Peter Tosh written by Peter Tosh from Can't Blame the Youth
"A Little Love", song by Los Pacaminos
"A Little Love", song by Chaka Demus
"A Little Love", song by John Holt and Prince Buster All Stars 1972
"A Little Love", song by Juice Newton 1984
"A Little Love", song by Amazulu B-side to "Excitable" 1985
"A Little Love", song by The Pasadenas B-side to "Riding on a Train" 1988
"A Little Love", song from MTV Unplugged (Bryan Adams album)
"A Little Love (Can Go a Long Long Way)", song by Roger Whittaker from All About Love 1992
"A Little Love, A Little Kiss", song by Django Reinhardt
"A Little in Love", song by Cliff Richard from 1980 album I'm No Hero
"Just a Little Love" (Reba McEntire song)
"Shine a Little Love", a 1979 song by Electric Light Orchestra